Dalbergia louvelii (violet rosewood) is a species of legume in the family Fabaceae.
It is found only in Madagascar.
It is threatened by habitat loss.

References

louvelii
Endemic flora of Madagascar
Endangered plants
Taxonomy articles created by Polbot